Bright AC was a 24-hour music format produced by Dial Global. Its playlist was mostly hot adult contemporary music spanning from the 1980s to this day from artists such as 3 Doors Down, U2, Nickelback Red Hot Chili Peppers, Kelly Clarkson, etc. that mainly targets female listeners ages 25–54.

Its competitors were "AC Active" by Waitt and "Hot AC" by Jones; however, those assets were absorbed by Triton Media Group, leaving ABC Radio's "Today's Best Hits" the only competitor. It was relocated into the "Hot AC" format on December 29, 2008..

External links 
Bright AC - Info from Dial Global

Radio formats
Defunct radio networks in the United States
Radio stations disestablished in 2008
Defunct radio stations in the United States